Heyligen is a surname. Notable people with the surname include:

Jos Heyligen (born 1947), Belgian footballer
Lodewijk Heyligen (1304–1361), Flemish Benedictine monk and music theorist